Power to Win is a 1942 short Australian documentary directed by Charles Chauvel about the Australian coal industry during World War II.

References

External links
Power to Win at National Film and Sound Archive
Power to Win at Australian Screen Online

1942 films
Australian World War II propaganda films
Australian documentary films
Documentary films about fossil fuels
1942 documentary films
Australian black-and-white films